Militosyan is an Armenian surname. Notable people with the surname include:

 Israel Militosyan (born 1968), Armenian weightlifter
 Vahagn Militosyan (born 1993), Armenian football player
 Vardan Militosyan (1950–2015), Soviet Armenian weightlifter